Diane Marie Amann is Regents' Professor of International Law and holds the Emily & Ernest Woodruff Chair in International Law at the University of Georgia School of Law. She has served since mid-2017 as a faculty co-director of the law school's Dean Rusk International Law Center, a position she took up after completing a two-and-a-half-year term as Associate Dean for International Programs & Strategic Initiatives. Additionally, she serves as Professor (by courtesy) of International Affairs at the University of Georgia School of Public and International Affairs and as an Affiliated Faculty Member at the University of Georgia African Studies Institute.
 
Amann is a noted expert in constitutional law, international law, human rights, children's rights, national security, laws of war, comparative law, and criminal law. Her scholarship includes analyses of the interaction of national, regional, and international legal regimes in efforts to combat atrocity and cross-border crime, in areas ranging from counterterrorism measures at Guantánamo to international criminal justice efforts at The Hague. From December 2012 to June 2021, she served as  International Criminal Court Prosecutor Fatou Bensouda's Special Adviser on Children in and affected by Armed Conflict; her service included assisting in preparation of the ICC Office of the Prosecutor Policy on Children (2016). Her 2019 lecture entitled "Child Rights, Conflict, and International Criminal Justice" is part of the United Nations Audiovisual Library on International Law.

In spring 2018, Amann was: a visiting researcher at the Faculty of Law, University of Oxford Bonavero Institute of Human Rights and a visiting fellow at Mansfield College, Oxford; an External Scientific Fellow at the Max Planck Institute Luxembourg for International, European & Regulatory Procedural Law; and the inaugural Breslauer, Rutman & Anderson Research Fellow at the USC Shoah Foundation Institute for Visual History and Education, Los Angeles.

Amann holds a Doctor honoris causa degree from Utrecht Universiteit in the Netherlands, a J.D. from Northwestern University School of Law in Chicago, an M.A. in political science from the University of California, Los Angeles, and a B.S. in journalism from the University of Illinois, Urbana-Champaign.  She served as a law clerk to U.S. Supreme Court Justice John Paul Stevens and practiced as a federal criminal defense attorney in San Francisco before entering academia. Formerly Professor of Law and founding Director of the California International Law Center at the University of California, Davis School of Law (Martin Luther King, Jr. Hall), she is a member of the Council on Foreign Relations, Counsellor and past Vice President of the American Society of International Law, from 2009 to 2011 and past Chair of the Section on International Law of the Association of American Law Schools.  She is a board member of the National Institute of Military Justice.

Amann is Editor-in-Chief of the American Society of International Law Benchbook on International Law (2014). In addition to her print publications, Amann has blogged at EJIL: Talk!, Just Security, The New York Times' Room for Debate, SCOTUSblog, Slate's Convictions, The Blog of Legal Times, and The Huffington Post. She was the founding editor and contributor of IntLawGrrls, a blog that featured contributors from more than 300 judges, academics, students, and practitioners, from 2007 to 2012; subsequently, she launched a solo blog, Diane Marie Amann.

See also 
 List of law clerks of the Supreme Court of the United States (Seat 4)

References

External links
 Georgia Law webpage
 Personal website/blog
 SSRN page

Living people
Law clerks of the Supreme Court of the United States
University of Illinois Urbana-Champaign College of Media alumni
University of California, Los Angeles alumni
Northwestern University Pritzker School of Law alumni
Year of birth missing (living people)
University of Georgia faculty
International law scholars
International criminal law scholars
American women lawyers
American legal scholars
American scholars of constitutional law
Legal educators
American women legal scholars